The Del Rey Apartments, located in northeast Portland, Oregon, are listed on the National Register of Historic Places.

See also
 National Register of Historic Places listings in Northeast Portland, Oregon

References

1925 establishments in Oregon
Residential buildings completed in 1925
Apartment buildings on the National Register of Historic Places in Portland, Oregon
Spanish Colonial Revival architecture in Oregon
Northeast Portland, Oregon
Kerns, Portland, Oregon
Portland Historic Landmarks